Michelle Davis is an American politician serving as a member of the Indiana House of Representatives from the 54th district. She assumed office on November 4, 2020.

Early life and education 
A native of Bargersville, Indiana, Davis graduated from Franklin Community High School. She earned a Bachelor of Science degree in elementary education from Ball State University in 1992 and a Master of Education in curriculum and instruction from Purdue University.

Career 
Outside of politics, Davis has worked at the Central Nine Career Center in Greenwood, Indiana. She was elected to the Indiana House of Representatives in November 2020. In 2021, Davis authored House Bill 1041, which would require "non-postsecondary schools to identify teams as either male, female or co-ed and bar transgender girls or women from competing in girls' or women’s athletics."

Personal life 
Davis and her husband, James, have two children. She lives in Whiteland, Indiana.

References 

Living people
Indiana Republicans
People from Johnson County, Indiana
Ball State University alumni
Purdue University alumni
Educators from Indiana
Year of birth missing (living people)